Reidar Øksnevad (13 May 1884 – 31 January 1958) was a Norwegian journalist, bibliographer and librarian.

He was born in Kristiansand to teacher Arnt Øksnevad and Kirsten Torine Folkvord, and was a brother of Toralv Øksnevad. Øksnevad lived in Paris for 34 years. He lectured at Sorbonne from 1913 to 1919, was a foreign correspondent for Dagbladet and other media, and was assigned librarian at the Bibliothèque Sainte-Geneviève from 1924 to 1928 and from 1940 to 1945. He published around forty books, including several bibliographies. Among his works is the two-volume Norsk litteraturhistorisk bibliografi, covering the periods 1900–1945 and 1946–1955. He was decorated Knight of the Legion of Honour and Officier d'Académie.

References

1884 births
1958 deaths
People from Kristiansand
Norwegian librarians
Norwegian bibliographers
Norwegian expatriates in France
Chevaliers of the Légion d'honneur
Officiers of the Ordre des Palmes Académiques
20th-century Norwegian journalists